Transmash Stadium is a football stadium in Mogilev, Belarus.

The stadium was a home ground for a now defunct club Transmash Mogilev until 1996, before their debut in Belarusian Premier League (in 1997). The stadium was not licensed to host top level matches.

In 2000s the stadium was occasionally used as a home venue for reserve teams of Dnepr Mogilev and Savit Mogilev in Belarusian Reserves League. Since 2009, it was only used at a city-level amateur competitions.

References

Football venues in Belarus
Sports venues in Mogilev
Buildings and structures in Mogilev Region